Hodeng-au-Bosc is a commune in the Seine-Maritime department in the Normandy region of northern France.

Geography
The commune also features a glassmaking factory, founded in 1623.

Population

Places of interest
 The church of St. Denis, dating from the nineteenth century.
 The church of St.Sauveur at Guimerville, dating from the sixteenth century.

People
Jean-Luc Thérier, racing driver for the Alpine Renault team in the 1970s, was born here in 1945.

See also
Communes of the Seine-Maritime department

References

Communes of Seine-Maritime